Thoracostomopsidae is a family of nematodes belonging to the order Enoplida.

Genera:
 Africanthion Inglis, 1964
 Cryptenoplus Riemann, 1966
 Enoploides Ssaweljev, 1912
 Enoplolaimus de Man, 1893
 Epacanthion Wieser, 1953
 Euthoracostomopsis Sergeeva, 1974
 Fenestrolaimus Filipjev, 1927
 Fleuronema Greenslade & Nicholas, 1991
 Filipjevia Kreis, 1928
 Hyptiolaimus Cobb, 1930
 Mesacanthion Filipjev, 1927
 Mesacanthoides Wieser, 1953
 Metenoploides Wieser, 1953
 Okranema Greenslade & Nicholas, 1991
 Oxyonchus Filipjev, 1927
 Paramesacanthion Wieser, 1953
 Parasaveljevia Wieser, 1953
 Parenoplus Filipjev, 1927
 Saveljevia Filipjev, 1925
 Thoracostomopsis Ditlevsen, 1918
 Trileptium Cobb, 1933

References

Nematodes